In telecommunication, the term noise power has the following meanings: 

 The measured total noise in a given bandwidth at the input or output of a device when the signal is not present; the integral of noise spectral density over the bandwidth
 The power generated by a random electromagnetic process.  
 Interfering and unwanted power in an electrical device or system. 
 In the acceptance testing of radio transmitters, the mean power supplied to the antenna transmission line by a radio transmitter when loaded with noise having a Gaussian amplitude-vs.-frequency distribution.

References

Telecommunication theory
Noise (electronics)